The rope event in rhythmic gymnastics  at the 2001 World Games in Akita was played from 22 to 23 August. The competition took place at Akita City Gymnasium.

Competition format
A total of 24 athletes entered the competition. The best eight athletes from preliminary round advances to the final.

Results

Preliminary

Final

References

External links
 Results on IWGA website

Rope